Ricardo Jorge Oliveira Valente (born 3 April 1991) is a Portuguese professional footballer who plays as a forward for Leixões.

Club career
Born in Porto, Valente spent his first years as a senior in the lower leagues. In summer 2013 he signed for C.D. Feirense in the Segunda Liga, making his debut as a professional on 27 July by starting in a 3–1 away loss against G.D. Chaves in the first round of the Taça da Liga. He scored his first league goal on 23 November, contributing to a 1–1 draw at Sporting CP B after entering the field as a late substitute.

Valente joined Leixões S.C. of the same tier in the 2014 off-season, quickly excelling to become one of the Matosinhos side's top scorers. In the following transfer window, he moved to Vitória de Guimarães.

Valente's first game in the Primeira Liga occurred on 10 January 2015, as he played 33 minutes of the 3–0 away defeat to S.L. Benfica. He found the net in the next match, a 4–0 home win over Académica de Coimbra, and finished the campaign with 17 league goals between Leixões and Vitória.

On 31 August 2016, Valente joined F.C. Paços de Ferreira on a season-long loan deal. The following 12 July, he signed a permanent two-year contract with C.S. Marítimo.

In March 2019, it was confirmed that Valente would not appear in any more matches for the Madeira club after having subject to disciplinary proceedings; president Carlos Pereira commented that the player had an "irreverent temper", this not being the first time he had been internally suspended.

Subsequently, Valente represented in quick succession Hatta Club (UAE Pro League), C.D. Tondela, CS Gaz Metan Mediaș (Romanian Liga I), Tuzlaspor (TFF First League), Ionikos F.C. (Super League Greece) and CS Mioveni (Romanian top division). In August 2022, the 31-year-old returned to Leixões after seven years.

References

External links

1991 births
Living people
Portuguese footballers
Footballers from Porto
Association football forwards
Primeira Liga players
Liga Portugal 2 players
Segunda Divisão players
AD Fafe players
C.D. Feirense players
Leixões S.C. players
Vitória S.C. players
F.C. Paços de Ferreira players
C.S. Marítimo players
C.D. Tondela players
UAE Pro League players
Hatta Club players
Liga I players
CS Gaz Metan Mediaș players
CS Mioveni players
TFF First League players
Tuzlaspor players
Super League Greece players
Ionikos F.C. players
Portuguese expatriate footballers
Expatriate footballers in the United Arab Emirates
Expatriate footballers in Romania
Expatriate footballers in Turkey
Expatriate footballers in Greece
Portuguese expatriate sportspeople in the United Arab Emirates
Portuguese expatriate sportspeople in Romania
Portuguese expatriate sportspeople in Turkey
Portuguese expatriate sportspeople in Greece